Melgund is a  geographic township and local services board in the Unorganized Part of Kenora District in northwestern Ontario, Canada. It has two unincorporated communities, Dyment and Borups Corners, and is counted as part of Kenora, Unorganized, Northern Ontario in Statistics Canada census data.

Ontario Highway 603 travels for its entire length between Dyment and Borups Corners.

References

Other map sources:

Geographic townships in Ontario
Communities in Kenora District
Local services boards in Ontario